The Cinema of Central Asia usually refers to the cinema of five Central Asian countries (Kazakhstan, Kyrgyzstan, Tajikistan, Turkmenistan and Uzbekistan). Central Asian cinema can further be divided into three historical periods, Soviet Central Asian film (1919–1987), a New Wave of Central Asian film (1988–1992), and the modern period of film of the independent Central Asian countries (1992–present).

Cinema of Kazakhstan

The cinema of Kazakhstan was recognized as a hub of Soviet documentaries and "Eastern style" romantics. Almaty, Kazakhstan is the starting place of the Kazakh "New Wave" of perestroika-era cinema (see Rashid Nugmanov). The independent film in Kazakhstan now is characterized by historical epics, such as Sergei Dvortsevoy's "Tulip".

Cinema of Kyrgyzstan

Early Kyrgyz film can be characterized by Russian-language Soviet films, such as "The First Teacher" by Andrei Konchalovsky. Later Kyrgyz films, such as Beshkempir were filmed in the Kyrgyz language and dealt with themes of urban and rural differences in Kyrygyzstan.

Cinema of Tajikistan

Tajik cinema in the Soviet era was marked by propaganda and an emphasis on secularism. Since Tajikistan's independence, Tajik cinema has grown into its own. Because of the Tajik Civil War from 1992–1997, virtually all of Tajik cinema before the new millennium was made abroad. Drawing from cinematic traditions in the East, West, and South (particularly from Iranian cinema), Tajik directors have been able to create influential films about the social and historical conditions of their land. Some major films include Bakhtyar Khudojnazarov's [Kosh ba kosh].
The cinema of Tajikistan is held back by a lack of government funding.

Cinema of Turkmenistan

Turkmen cinema has historically been highly regulated by the state government and has been reflective of the political trends. Cinema in Turkmenistan was completely abolished by President Saparmurat Niyazov in the year 2000. Several important films were created in the 1990s including Little Angel, Make Me Happy by director Sapar Usmanov. The ban on cinema has now been lifted.

Cinema of Uzbekistan

Uzbek film has a long list of films produced in the Soviet era and the modern era. The history of Uzbek cinema can be divided into two periods: the cinema of the Soviet Uzbekistan (1924–1991) and the cinema of the independent Uzbekistan (1991-present). Films of the Soviet period were shot either in Russian or Uzbek. Most critically acclaimed films of the Soviet period include films such as Maftuningman (1958), Mahallada duv-duv gap (1960), and Shum bola (1977).

See also
 Cinema of Asia
 Cinema of the Soviet Union

Further reading
1. Ten Years Under the Winds of Different Ideologies (Gulnara Abikeeva)
http://www.kinokultura.com/CA/A2tenyears.html

2. Central Asian Films (Jared Rapfogel)
http://www.sensesofcinema.com/2003/feature-articles/central_asian_films/

3. Young Kazakh Filmmakers:  New “New Wave” on the Road (Jane Knox-Voina)
http://www.kinokultura.com/2010/27-knoxvoina.shtml

Central Asian culture
Asian cinema
Asian cinema by region